The Deputy Governor of Jigawa State is the second-highest official of the Government of Jigawa State, Nigeria, who acts as the subordinate to the Governor. The Deputy Governor is selected as a running-mate by the gubernatorial nominee of a party after the primary elections. On 28 May 2019, Umar Namadi was sworn in as the current Deputy Governor of Jigawa State after he was elected into office during the 2019 Nigerian election.

Qualifications 
As in the case of the Governor, in order to be qualified to be elected as Deputy Governor, a person must:

 be at least thirty-five (35) years of age;
 be a Nigerian citizen by birth;
 be a member of a political party with endorsement by that political party;
 have School Certificate or its equivalent.

Responsibilities 
The Deputy Governor assists the Governor in exercising primary assignments and is also eligible to replace a dead, impeached, absent or ill Governor as required by the 1999 Constitution of Nigeria.

Oath of office 
The oath of office is administered by the Chief Judge of the State or any Judge appointed to act in his stead. It's the same oath taken by the Vice President of Nigeria and Commissioners serving in the state

Tenure 
The Deputy Governor is elected through popular vote on a ticket with the Governor for a term of four years. They may be re-elected for a second term but may not serve for more than two consecutive terms.

List of Deputy Governors
This is a list of deputy governors of Jigawa State. Jigawa State was formed in 1991-08-27 when it was split from Kano State.

See also
Governor of Jigawa State
Jigawa State

References

Jigawa State
Nigerian government officials